Lois Winkelmann Kolkhorst (born November 4, 1964) is an American businesswoman and politician serving as a Republican member of the Texas State Senate.  She was first elected to the state Senate from the 18th District in a special election held on December 6, 2014.

Early life

Kolkhorst grew up in Brenham, Texas and is a graduate of Brenham High School. She is a 1988 graduate of Texas Christian University in Fort Worth, Texas, at which she studied advertising and public relations and played on the women's golf team.

Before joining the Texas Senate, she served as president and CEO of the Washington County Chamber of Commerce.

Political career

Kolkhorst was seven terms in the Texas House representing House District 13, which included counties Austin, Burleson, Colorado, Fayette, Grimes, Lavaca, Washington.

Since 2014, Kolkhorst has represented the 18th District in the Texas Senate, a seat she won in 2014 in a special election. The district serves Victoria, Texas and stretches from Corpus Christi north to near Bryan.

She was named one of the "Best Legislators" and  "Worst Legislators" in Texas by Texas Monthly magazine in 2007 and 2017 respectively.

She is Chair of the Senate Committee on Health and Human Services, as well as a member of the Senate Transportation Committee, Senate Select Committee on Texas Ports, Senate Committee on Water and Rural Affairs, the Texas Agriculture Policy Board, the State Water Implementation Fund for Texas Advisory Committee, the Texas Windstorm Insurance Oversight Board. and Committee on Nominations.

In 2021, Kolkhorst approvingly tweeted "Let freedom ring!" in support of legislation that prohibited businesses and government entities from requiring proof of vaccination for products or services.

In February 2023, Kolkhorst introduced a bill that could potentially ban Chinese and Russian immigrants from purchasing homes in Texas.

Personal life

Kolkhorst and her husband, James Darren "Jim" Kolkhorst, have two children. Though they reside in Brenham, the couple owns and operates Kolkhorst Petroleum in Navasota in Grimes County. The company was founded by Jim Kolkhorst's father, James Henry "Bubba" Kolkhorst.

She is a member of the St. Paul's Evangelical Lutheran Church in Brenham.

References

External links

 

1964 births
Living people
Republican Party members of the Texas House of Representatives
Republican Party Texas state senators
People from Brenham, Texas
Texas Christian University alumni
Businesspeople from Texas
American Lutherans
Women state legislators in Texas
Golfers from Texas
21st-century American politicians
21st-century American women politicians
20th-century American businesspeople
20th-century American businesswomen
21st-century American businesspeople
21st-century American businesswomen